Visual angle is the angle a viewed object subtends at the eye, usually stated in degrees of arc.
It also is called the object's angular size.

The diagram on the right shows an observer's eye  looking at a frontal extent (the vertical arrow) that has a  linear size , located in the distance  from point .

For present purposes, point  can represent  the eye's nodal points at about the center of the lens, and also represent the center of the eye's entrance pupil that is only a few millimeters in front of the lens.

The three lines from object endpoint  heading toward the eye indicate the bundle of  light rays that pass through the cornea, pupil and lens to form an optical image of  endpoint  on the retina at point .
The central line of the bundle represents the chief ray.

Measuring and computing
The visual angle  can be measured directly using a theodolite placed at point .

Or, it can be calculated (in radians) using the formula, .

However, for visual angles smaller than about 10 degrees, this simpler formula provides very close approximations:

The retinal image and visual angle
(See visual system). For small angles, the size of this retinal image  is

where  is the distance from the nodal points to the retina, about 17 mm.

Examples
If one looks at a one-centimeter object at a distance of one meter and a two-centimeter object at a distance of two meters, both subtend the same visual angle of about 0.01 rad or 0.57°.  Thus they have the same retinal image size .

Also, for some  easy observations, if one holds one's index finger at arm's length, the width of the index fingernail subtends approximately one degree, and the width of the thumb at the first joint subtends approximately two degrees.

Therefore, if one is interested in the performance of the eye or the first processing steps in the visual cortex, it does not make sense to refer to the absolute size of a viewed object (its linear size ). What matters is the visual angle  which determines the size of the retinal image.

Terminological confusions
In astronomy the term apparent size refers to the physical angle  or angular diameter.

But in psychophysics and experimental psychology the adjective "apparent" refers to a person's subjective experience.
So, "apparent size" has  referred to how large an object looks, also often called its "perceived size".

Additional confusion has occurred because there are two qualitatively different "size" experiences for a viewed object.
The perceived  visual angle is best defined as the difference between the perceived directions of the object's endpoints from oneself.

Widespread  use of the ambiguous  terms "apparent size" and "perceived size" without specifying the units of  measure has caused confusion.

Representation of visual angle in visual cortex
The brain's primary visual cortex (area V1 or Brodmann area 17) contains a spatially isomorphic representation of the retina (see retinotopy).  Loosely speaking,  it is a distorted "map" of the retina. Accordingly, the size  of a given retinal image determines the extent of the neural activity pattern eventually generated in area V1 by the associated retinal activity pattern. Murray, Boyaci, & Kersten (2006) recently used Functional magnetic resonance imaging  (fMRI) to show that an increase in a viewed target's visual angle, which increases , also increases the extent of the corresponding neural activity pattern in area V1.

The observers in experiment carried out by Murray and colleagues viewed a flat picture with two discs that subtended the same visual angle  and formed retinal images of the same size , but the perceived angular size  of one was about 17% larger than for the other, due to differences in the background patterns for the disks. It was shown that the areas of the activity in V1 related to the disks were of unequal size, despite the fact that the retinal images were the same size.  This size difference in area V1 correlated with the 17% illusory difference between the perceived visual angles. This finding has implications for spatial illusions such as the visual angle illusion.

See also
Visual acuity
Visual angle illusion

Notes

References
 Baird, J. C. (1970).  Psychophysical analysis of visual space. Oxford, London: Pergamon Press.
 Joynson, R. B. (1949). The problem of size and distance. Quarterly Journal of Experimental Psychology, 1, 119–135.
 McCready, D. (1965). Size-distance perception and accommodation-convergence micropsia: A critique. Vision Research. 5, 189–206.
 McCready, D. (1985). On size, distance and visual angle perception. Perception & Psychophysics, 37, 323–334.
 Murray, S.O., Boyaci, H, & Kersten, D. (2006) The representation of perceived angular size in human primary visual cortex. Nature Neuroscience, 9, 429–434 (1 March 2006).
 McCready, D. The Moon Illusion Explained.

External links
The University at Buffalo's Interactive Visual Acuity Chart for the display of letters or symbols for a specified Snellen line on your computer monitor at exactly the right size (note: you must follow the instructions for calibration).

Vision
Angle